Howesville may refer to:

Howesville, Indiana
Howesville, West Virginia

See also
Hawesville, Kentucky